Crunk Energy Drink, sometimes stylized as CRUNK!!! Energy, is an energy supplement owned by Solvi Acquisition LLC, a privately held company headquartered in Twinsburg, OH.

History 
CRUNK Energy was invented in 2004 by spirits entrepreneur Sidney Frank. In 2017, Solvi acquired Crunk Energy. American Rapper Lil Jon will stay on as chief brand advisor.

Flavors 
 CRUNK Energy Pomegranate
 CRUNK Energy Tropical-Blast 
 CRUNK Energy Mango-Peach 
 CRUNK Energy Grape-Acai
 CRUNK Energy Blood-Orange

References

External links
 Crunk!!! Energy Drink - Official Website

Drink companies of the United States
Companies established in 2004
Energy drinks
Products introduced in 2004
Sports drinks
Food and drink companies based in Ohio